"Beethoven (I Love to Listen To)" is a song by British pop duo Eurythmics, released on 12 October 1987 as the lead single from their sixth studio album, Savage (1987).

Background

Writing
It was written by group members Annie Lennox and David A. Stewart.  Although not released as a single in the United States, the track appeared as a double A-side of the 12 inch single for "I Need a Man", and  received heavy rotation on MTV. It was a Top 20 hit in several European territories and also in Australia.

Style
The Savage album returned Eurythmics to a more electronic sound and the "Beethoven" vocals are performed mostly as spoken-word from Lennox, with the exception of the repeated phrase "I love to" throughout the track.

Music video

Music videos were produced for all twelve tracks on the Savage album, all directed by Sophie Muller, and most of them with a shared concept featuring character(s) played by Lennox who display characteristics of dissociative identity disorder or split personalities.

As the first part of this loose narrative, the "Beethoven" video begins with Lennox portraying a repressed, middle-class housewife, knitting in her apartment. She exhibits characteristics of obsessive–compulsive disorder through her habitual cleaning and chopping of vegetables. The video also includes a mischievous little girl who has blonde hair, and a man who is wearing make-up and an evening gown, neither of whom are directly noticed by the housewife even though they are in her living room with her. These characters are seemingly components of a new character that the dowdy housewife becomes as she has a nervous breakdown and transforms herself into a blonde, overtly sexual vixen. In this newly liberated persona, she trashes the apartment that, as a housewife, she had kept meticulously clean. The video ends with her walking out into the street laughing.

Critical reception
Upon its release as a single, Pete Paisley of Record Mirror described it as "the strangest Lennox/Stewart song to date" and "totally loop-di-loop". He added, "Annie assumes a variety of singing voices over a typically brisk production from chum Dave. Impossible to tell what's going on. But let's just hope they make enough dosh from it never to have to do it again." Jerry Smith of Music Week praised it as a "striking track" with its "spoken verses and curiously catchy chorus".

Track listings
7-inch single (UK, GER, FR, SP, AUS)
 "Beethoven (I Love To Listen To)" (7" Edit) – 3:59
 "Heaven" (LP Version) – 3:24

12-inch (UK, GER, FR, SP, AUS)
 "Beethoven (I Love To Listen To)" (Dance Mix) – 5:18
 "Heaven" (LP Version) – 3:24
 "Beethoven (I Love To Listen To)" (LP Version) – 4:48 *

CD single (UK, GER)
 "Beethoven (I Love To Listen To)" (7" Edit) – 3:59
 "Heaven" (LP Version) – 3:24
 "Beethoven (I Love To Listen To)" (Dance Mix) – 5:18

CD single (JP)
 "Beethoven (I Love To Listen To)" (7" Edit) – 3:59
 "Heaven" (LP Version) – 3:24

 this version although labelled as "extended" on the single cover is actually the LP version.

Charts

References

1987 songs
1987 singles
Eurythmics songs
Music videos directed by Sophie Muller
RCA Records singles
Songs written by Annie Lennox
Songs written by David A. Stewart
Song recordings produced by Dave Stewart (musician and producer)